Sho'eva is a moshav in central Israel. Located west of Jerusalem, it falls under the jurisdiction of Mateh Yehuda Regional Council.

History
The moshav was established as a work village in 1950 by immigrants from Yemen on land that had belonged to the Arab village of Saris, which was destroyed in 1948. In 1952 settlement planning authorities decided that the village had been established by mistake and demanded that the settlers vacate. When they refused, the water supply and other services were reduced to motivate the residents to leave. Although the village closed in 1952, it was re-established in 1959.

References

Moshavim
Agricultural Union
Populated places established in 1950
Populated places in Jerusalem District
Yemeni-Jewish culture in Israel
1950 establishments in Israel